Boyack is a surname and may refer to one of the following:

Alf Boyack (1877–1947), Australian rules footballer
Pat Boyack (born 1967), American electric blues guitarist and songwriter
Rachel Boyack, New Zealand politician
Ronald Boyack (1906–1988), Trinidadian cricketer
Sarah Boyack (born 1961), Scottish Labour Party politician
Steven Boyack (born 1976), Scottish professional footballer

Scottish surnames
Surnames of Scottish origin
Surnames of British Isles origin